Charles Anthony "Buster" Williams (born April 17, 1942) is an American jazz bassist. Williams is known for his membership in pianist Herbie Hancock's early 1970s group, working with guitarist Larry Coryell from the 1980s to present, working in the Thelonious Monk repertory band Sphere and as the accompanist of choice for many singers, including Nancy Wilson.

Biography

Early life and career
Williams' father, Charles Anthony Williams Sr., was a musician who played bass, drums, and piano, and had band rehearsals in the family home in Camden, New Jersey, exposing Williams to jazz at an early age. Williams was particularly inspired to focus on bass after hearing his father's record of Star Dust, performed by Oscar Pettiford, and started playing in his early teens.  

He had his first professional gig while he was still a junior high school student, filling in for Charles Sr., who had double booked himself one evening.  Williams later spent his days practicing with Sam Dockery, who was playing in Jimmy Heath's band in Philadelphia on a regular double bill with Sam Reed. Charles Sr. hosted a jam session at a club called Rip's and gave Williams the opportunity to put his own group together for a Monday night show in 1959, and in an effort to work his way into Heath's band, Williams hired Sam Reed. The plan worked, as two days later Reed contacted Williams about playing in his band that coming Saturday, which demonstrated Williams' talent to Heath, who in turn hired Williams the following week.

Williams attended Camden High School. Just after graduating high school in 1960, Williams had the opportunity to play with Gene Ammons and Sonny Stitt when Nelson Boyd reached out to Charles Sr. to cover for him. Charles Sr. was also unable to make the gig, and sent Buster in his stead.  After the first set on a Friday night, Ammons and Stitt asked Williams to join the band on tour, starting in Chicago, after playing through the weekend in Philadelphia.  Williams toured with them for about a year, from 1960 into 1961, until the group got stranded in Kansas City and was abandoned by Ammons, who fled without paying the band.  The rhythm section managed to work with Al Hibbler for one week in order to earn enough for train fare to return home.  Williams made his first two recordings with the Ammons/Stitt group in August 1961, Dig Him! for Argo Records and Boss Tenors for Verve, both recorded in Chicago.

Education
Williams attended Combs College of Music in Philadelphia irregularly during and after his tenure with the Ammons/Stitt group.  He learned composition, syntax, harmony and theory from Dr. Roland Wiggins.

Vocal accompanist
Williams was hired by Dakota Staton after hearing him at a gig in Wilmington, Delaware with the Gerald Price Trio in 1961.  This was closely followed by work with Betty Carter in 1962 and Sarah Vaughan in 1963.  Vaughan took him on his first European tour, during which he connected with the Miles Davis Quintet on the French Riviera. In 1964, Williams formed a more lasting working relationship with Nancy Wilson, with whom he recorded several albums for Capitol Records, and as a result he moved to Los Angeles.  Williams would go on to work with numerous other vocalists throughout his career, including Sathima Bea Benjamin, Shirley Horn, Betty Carter, Jonathan Schwartz, Carmen McRae, Roseanna Vitro, Helen Merrill, Nnenna Freelon, Jon Lucien, Marguerite Mariama, and Champian Fulton.

West Coast
Williams' move to the West Coast facilitated touring and recording with Nancy Wilson as well as The Jazz Crusaders, with whom he recorded five albums for Pacific Jazz.  According to Williams, he was "the number one sub for Ray Brown" during this time, playing with Kenny Dorham, recording a date with the Harold Land/Bobby Hutcherson quintet, and ultimately working with Miles Davis for several months in 1967.

Herbie Hancock Sextet
In October 1968, Williams moved to New York City and continued to work steadily, playing shows with Art Blakey, Herbie Mann, and Mary Lou Williams, while recording for Atlantic, Blue Note, and Prestige with artists such as McCoy Tyner, Dexter Gordon, Roy Ayers, Stanley Turrentine, Frank Foster, Illinois Jacquet, and, once again, Gene Ammons (recently returned from a seven-year stint in Joliet).  Having worked with Herbie Hancock in the Miles Davis Quintet, Williams became a fixture of Hancock's Mwandishi Sextet, recording three albums for Warner Bros., Sextant for Columbia, The Prisoner for Blue Note, and two more under Eddie Henderson's name for Capricorn.  The Mwandishi Sextet explored new electronic sounds in jazz and featured Williams on both acoustic and electric bass.

Debut as leader
Buster Williams made his recording debut as leader in 1975 with the album Pinnacle for Muse Records, and he went on to lead several more sessions for Muse, Denon, and Buddah through 1980.  He also backed Ron Carter on several recording dates which featured Carter soloing on piccolo bass.  From the 1970s onward, Williams worked steadily as a sideman for Mary Lou Williams, Kenny Barron, Jimmy Rowles,  Larry Coryell, Stanley Cowell, Steve Turre, and Frank Morgan, among others.  For 18 years between 1980 and 1998, Williams made only one record as leader, 1989's Something More, with Herbie Hancock, Wayne Shorter, Al Foster, and trumpeter Shunzo Ono, featuring five original compositions by Williams.  He continues to perform with a rotating lineup as Buster Williams' "Something More", touring Europe in 2013 with Joey Baron, Eric Reed, and saxophonist Bruce Williams.  Beginning with Somewhere Along the Way in 1998, Williams increased his output as leader into the new century, notably recording Griot Libertè for HighNote in 2004, engineered, mixed, and mastered by Rudy Van Gelder and released in the Hybrid SACD format with a 5.0 surround sound mix.  In June 2008, Williams self-released Live Volume 1 exclusively as a digital download.

Further collaborations

Williams was nominated for a Grammy Award for his work with Hank Jones and Tony Williams on Love For Sale, the first of Jones' records credited to "The Great Jazz Trio". Williams also continued to tour with Herbie Hancock throughout the 1980s and 1990s, and performed at a Grammy Awards ceremony with Hancock, Tony Williams, and Bobby McFerrin.  1982 saw Williams form two important collaborative ensembles, the Timeless All-Stars, a sextet featuring Harold Land, Curtis Fuller, Bobby Hutcherson, Cedar Walton, and Billy Higgins, which recorded four albums for the Dutch label Timeless Records, and Sphere, featuring Kenny Barron, Ben Riley, Charlie Rouse, and later Gary Bartz.  Sphere began as a tribute to Thelonious Monk, making their first recording for Elektra on February 17, 1982, the day Monk died, but soon incorporated the band members' own compositions along with other jazz standards.

Recent work

From 2010 into 2014, Buster Williams toured with Sonny Fortune, Mike Stern, and Jimmy Cobb as "4 Generations of Miles", named after a 2002 concert and recording for Chesky representing four different eras of Miles Davis bands.  The original group featured Ron Carter and George Coleman in place of Williams and Fortune.  The Buster Williams School of Music developed from a summer class Williams ran for the IDEA Performing Arts Center in Camden in 2012.  Williams formed his own non-profit corporation to continue this work in 2013.  "Something More" performed at the Portland Jazz Festival and Dimitriou's Jazz Alley in February 2014, this time consisting of Williams' former Mwandishi bandmates Bennie Maupin and Julian Priester, along with Cindy Blackman-Santana and George Colligan.  Williams made a short tour of Europe in March 2014 as part of the Steve Kuhn trio with Billy Drummond.

Film and television work
Williams worked on several film soundtracks and television commercials (including Coca-Cola, Budweiser, and Old Spice) throughout his career.  The 1969 film Mackenna's Gold featured Williams on the soundtrack working under Quincy Jones. Williams reunited with Ron Carter for Alain Corneau's 1981 film Le Choix des Armes, with music composed by Philippe Sarde and performed by the London Symphony Orchestra.  In the 1990s, Williams worked with Angelo Badalamenti on David Lynch's Twin Peaks: Fire Walk with Me and with Terence Blanchard for the Spike Lee film Clockers.  Williams made several television appearances as well, performing five of his own compositions with Branford Marsalis' The Tonight Show band, and backing Erroll Garner during an earlier Tonight Show appearance.  He appeared on The Andy Williams Show with Nancy Wilson, with Bill Cosby on The Joan Rivers Show, and with Joe Williams on Sesame Street.  Williams appeared as himself in the 2004 Steven Spielberg film The Terminal, playing in Benny Golson's quartet with Mike LeDonne and Carl Allen. In 2019, Buster Williams, From Bass to Infinity, a documentary film by Adam Kahan was released about Williams' life, career and philosophy.

Personal life
Williams was married in 1965 to Veronica, whom he met in junior high school, and as of 2014, he lives in Camden with his wife.  Introduced to chanting Nam-myoho-renge-kyo  by his sister in 1972, Williams and his wife took up the Nichiren Buddhist practice after she suffered a concussion in a car accident, and he has continued the practice ever since as a member of the global Buddhist association Soka Gakkai International. His 2004 album Griot Libertè was inspired by another health crisis when Veronica recovered from a coma following a heart attack.

Awards and honors
In addition to his Grammy nomination, Williams was awarded a National Endowment for the Arts grant for composition as well as a New York Foundation for the Arts Fellowship Grant in 1991. Williams has also been recognized by the Min-On Concert Association, RVC Corporation, and Soka Gakkai International.

Critical reception
The Penguin Guide to Jazz on CD declared Buster Williams "one of the key sidemen in modern jazz" with "a rock-solid grounding in harmony, counterpoint and orchestration."  The guide observed that "Buster's harmony is impeccable and he has a rhythmic sense that is unfailing, feeling and utterly original."  Critic Ron Wynn ranked the Mwandishi Sextet "among the finest jazz-rock and pop-tinged units of all time."  Critic Thomas Conrad praised Williams' work as a leader in his Down Beat review of the 2001 album Houdini, stating that the album "could in fact be taken as a clinic for bassists on how to assume a more proactive, forward position in an ensemble without throwing it out of balance," and that "in [Williams'] hands, the bass is a fully articulate solo voice."

Gear
Williams' instrument is a copy of a late-1800s Boosey & Hawkes Panormo, using La Bella strings and a Fishman BP-100 pickup, with a 1x15 Polytone Mini-Brute bass amp.

Discography

As leader 
 Pinnacle (Muse, 1975)
 Crystal Reflections (Muse, 1976)
 Tokudo (Denon, 1978)
 Heartbeat (Muse, 1978)
 Dreams Come True (Buddah, 1980)
 Two as One with Kenny Barron (Red, 1987) – live rec. 1986
 Something More (In+Out, 1989)
 Somewhere Along the Way (TCB, 1998)
 Lost in a Memory (TCB, 1999)
 Live at the Montreux Jazz Festival 1999 (TCB, 2001) – live rec. 1999
 Houdini (Sirocco Jazz Ltd., 2001)
 Joined at the Hip (TCB, 2002) – rec. 1998
 Griot Libertè (HighNote, 2004)
 65 Roses (BluePort Jazz, 2008) – rec. 2006
 Buster Williams Live Volume 1 (Buster Williams, 2008)

As sideman 

With Geri Allen
 The Gathering (Verve, 1998)
 Jazzpar Concerts 2003 (Stunt, 2006)

With Gene Ammons
 Dig Him! with Sonny Stitt (Argo, 1961) – also released as We'll Be Together Again (Prestige, 1968)
 Boss Tenors with Sonny Stitt (Verve, 1961)
 The Boss Is Back! (Prestige, 1969)
 Brother Jug! (Prestige, 1969)

With Roy Ayers
 Virgo Vibes (Atlantic, 1967)
 Daddy Bug (Atlantic, 1969)

With Angelo Badalamenti
 Twin Peaks: Fire Walk With Me (Warner Bros., 1992)
 Twin Peaks: Season Two Music and More with David Lynch (David Lynch Music Co., 2007)With Chet Baker Chet Baker / Wolfgang Lackerschmid with Wolfgang Lackerschmid (Sandra Music Productions, 1979)
 Peace (Enja, 1982)With Kenny Barron Innocence (Wolf, 1978)
 Golden Lotus (Muse, 1982) – rec. 1980
 Imo Live (Whynot, 1982)
 Green Chimneys (Criss Cross Jazz, 1983)
 Two as One (Red, 1986)With Sathima Bea Benjamin Windsong (Ekapa, 1985)
 Love Light (Enja, 1987)
 Southern Touch (Enja, 1989)
 SongSpirit (Ekapa, 2006)With Art BlakeyArt Blakey and the All Star Messengers (Jazz Line, 1982)
The Art of Jazz: Live in Leverkusen (In+Out, 1989)With Ron Carter Piccolo (Milestone, 1977)
 Peg Leg (Milestone, 1978)
 Pick 'Em (Milestone, 1980) – rec. 1978With Cyrus Chestnut Natural Essence (HighNote, 2016)
 There's a Sweet, Sweet Spirit (HighNote, 2017)With Norman Connors Dark of Light (Buddah, 1973)
 Love From The Sun (Buddah, 1973)With Larry Coryell Equipoise (Muse, 1985)
 Toku Do (Muse, 1987)
 Air Dancing (Jazzpoint, 1988)
 Shining Hour (Muse, 1989)
 New High (HighNote, 2000)
 Cedars of Avalon (HighNote, 2002)With Sonny Fortune Waves of Dreams (Horizon, 1976)
 Four in One (Blue Note, 1994)With Benny Golson Voices All with The Jazztet (East World, 1982)
 Terminal 1 (Concord Jazz, 2004)
 New Time, New 'Tet (Concord Jazz, 2009)
 Horizon Ahead (HighNote, 2016)With Dexter Gordon The Tower of Power! (Prestige, 1969)
 More Power! (Prestige, 1969)
 Tangerine (Prestige, 1972)
 Generation (Prestige, 1972)With Herbie Hancock The Prisoner  (Blue Note, 1969)
 Fat Albert Rotunda (Warner Bros., 1969)
 Mwandishi  (Warner Bros., 1969)
 Crossings (Warner Bros., 1972)
 Sextant  (Columbia, 1973)
 VSOP (Columbia, 1977)With Billy Hart Enchance (Horizon, 1977)
 Rah (Gramavision, 1988)With Eddie Henderson Realization (Capricorn, 1973)
 Inside Out (Capricorn, 1974)
 Sunburst (Blue Note, 1975)With Buck Hill This Is Buck Hill (SteepleChase, 1978)
 Scope (SteepleChase, 1979)With Shirley Horn A Lazy Afternoon (SteepleChase, 1979)
 You Won't Forget Me (Verve, 1991)With Bobby Hutcherson Farewell Keystone (Theresa, 1982)
 In the Vanguard (Landmark, 1987)With Abdullah Ibrahim African River (Enja, 1989)
 No Fear, No Die (TipToe, 1990)With The Jazz Crusaders Uh Huh (Pacific Jazz, 1967)
 Lighthouse '68 (Pacific Jazz, 1968)
 The Festival Album (Pacific Jazz, 1968)
 Powerhouse (Pacific Jazz, 1969)
 Lighthouse '69 (Pacific Jazz, 1969)
 Give Peace a Chance (Liberty, 1970)With Steve Kuhn Porgy (Evidence, 1988)
 Love Walked In (Venus, 2003)
 Plays Standards (Venus, 2007)With Harold Land The Peace-Maker (Cadet, 1967)
 A New Shade of Blue (Mainstream, 1971)
 Damisi (Mainstream, 1972)With Harold Mabern Workin' & Wailin' (Prestige, 1969)
 Greasy Kid Stuff! (Prestige, 1970)With John McNeil Look to the Sky with Tom Harrell (SteepleChase, 1979)
 John McNeil, Faun (SteepleChase, 1981)With Meeco Perfume e Caricias (Connector, 2010)
 Beauty of the Night (Connector, 2012)With Frank Morgan Lament (Contemporary, 1986)
 Bebop Lives! (Contemporary, 1987)
 Mood Indigo (Antilles, 1989)With David "Fathead" Newman Resurgence! (Muse, 1981)
 The Gift (HighNote, 2003)With Houston Person The Big Horn (Muse, 1979) – rec. 1976
 Very PERSONal (Muse, 1980) 
 The Talk of the Town (Muse, 1987)With Wallace Roney No Room for Argument (Stretch, 2000)
 A Place in Time (HighNote, 2016)With Jimmy Rowles Paws That Refresh (Choice, 1980)
 The Chess Players (Candid, 2010) recorded 1976With Hilton Ruiz Piano Man (SteepleChase, 1975)
 Excition (SteepleChase, 1977)
 Steppin' Into Beauty (SteepleChase, 1982) – rec. 1977With Woody Shaw The Moontrane (Muse, 1974)
 Woody III (Columbia, 1979)
 Setting Standards (Muse, 1983)With Sphere Four in One (Elektra/Musician, 1982)
 Flight Path (Elektra/Musician, 1983)
 Sphere On Tour (Red, 1985)
 Pumpkin's Delight (Red, 1993) – rec. 1986
 Four for All (Verve, 1987)
 Bird Songs (Verve, 1988)
 Sphere (Verve, 1997)With Buddy Terry Awareness (Mainstream, 1971)
 Pure Dynamite (Mainstream, 1972)With The Timeless All Stars It's Timeless (Timeless, 1982)
 Timeless Heart (Timeless, 1983)
 Essence (Delos, 1986)
 Time For The Timeless All Stars (Early Bird, 1991)With Steve Turre Fire and Ice (Stash, 1988)
 Right There (Antilles, 1991)
 Lotus Flower (Verve, 1999)
 TNT (Trombone-N-Tenor) (Telarc, 2001)
 The Spirits Up Above (HighNote, 2004)With Stanley Turrentine Another Story (Blue Note, 1969)
 The Man with the Sad Face (Fantasy, 1976)With McCoy Tyner Asante (Blue Note, 1970)
 Sama Layuca (Milestone, 1974)With Michal Urbaniak Music for Violin and Jazz Quartet (Jam, 1980)
 Jazz Legends (Ubx, 1998)With Cedar Walton Among Friends (Evidence, 1990) – live rec. 1982 at Keystone Korner
 Voices Deep Within (HighNote, 2009)With Mary Lou Williams Free Spirits (SteepleChase, 1975)
 My Mama Pinned a Rose on Me (Pablo, 1977)With Nancy Wilson Hollywood - My Way (Capitol, 1963)
 The Nancy Wilson Show! (Capitol, 1965)
 Lush Life (Capitol, 1967)
 Welcome to My Love (Capitol, 1968)
 Hurt So Bad (Capitol, 1969)With Denny Zeitlin As Long As There's Music (Venus, 1997)
 Slickrock (MAXJAZZ, 2004)
 Trio in Concert (Sunnyside, 2009)
 Stairway to the Stars (Sunnyside, 2014) – rec. 2001 at The Jazz BakeryWith Others' Franco Ambrosetti, Wings (Enja, 1984) – rec. 1983. also released as Gin and Pentatonic.
 Ben Aronov, Bob Brookmeyer and Tom Harrell, Shadow Box (Choice, 1979)
 Bill Barron, Jazz Caper (Muse, 1982) – rec. 1978
 Gary Bartz, Episode One: Children of Harlem (Challenge, 1994)
 Cindy Blackman, Arcane (Muse, 1988) – rec. 1987
 Hamiet Bluiett, Dangerously Suite (Soul Note, 1981)
 Donald Brown, Sources of Inspiration (Muse, 1989)
 Ted Brown, In Good Company with Jimmy Raney (Criss Cross, 1985)
 Will Calhoun, Native Lands (Half Note, 2005)
 Betty Carter, The Betty Carter Album (Bet-Car, 1976)
 Billy Childs, Skim Coat (Metropolitan, 1999)
 Cyrus Chestnut, Black Nile (Grave News, 2008)
 Freddy Cole, It's Crazy, But I'm in Love (After 9, 1997)
 Junior Cook, Somethin's Cookin' (Muse, 1981)
 Stanley Cowell, We Three (DIW, 1987) 
 Jaiman Crunk, Encounters (Origin, 2012)
 Albert Dailey, That Old Feeling (SteepleChase, 1978)
 Miles Davis, Sorcerer (Columbia, 1967) alt. take of "Limbo" only on CD reissue
 Walter Davis Jr., Illumination (Denon, 1977)
 Cornell Dupree, Saturday Night Fever (Versatile, 1977)
 Kenny Drew, Third Phase (Jazz City, 1989)
 Teddy Edwards, Midnight Creeper (HighNote, 1997)
 Kevin Eubanks, Opening Night (GRP, 1985)
 Gil Evans, Lunar Eclypse (Robi Droli, 1992) – live rec. 1981 
 Joe Farrell, Outback  (CTI, 1971)
 Bruce Forman, The Bash (Muse, 1982)
 Sonny Fortune, Four in One (Blue Note, 1994)
 Frank Foster, Manhattan Fever (Blue Note, 1968) previously unreleased 1969 session with Buster Williams appended to CD reissue
 Rebecca Coupe Franks, Suit of Armor (Justice, 1992)
 Nnenna Freelon, Nnenna Freelon (Columbia, 1992)
 Chico Freeman, Peaceful Heart, Gentle Spirit (Contemporary, 1980)
 Carlos Garnett, Black Love (Muse, 1974)
 Stan Getz and Jimmie Rowles, The Peacocks (Columbia, 1975)
 Benny Green, In This Direction (Criss Cross, 1989)
 Grant Green, Easy (Versatile, 1978)
 Charles Greenlee, I Know About the Life (Baystate, 1977)
 Winard Harper, Be Yourself (Epicure, 1994)
 Beaver Harris, 360°Experience - A Well-Kept Secret (Shemp, 1980)
 Heads of State, Search for Peace (Smoke Sessions, 2015)
 Albert Heath, Kawaida  (O'Be, 1970)
 Joan Hickey, Soulmates (Chicago Lakeside Jazz, 1998)
 John Hicks, On the Wings of an Eagle (Chesky, 2006)
 Billy Higgins, Bridgework (Contemporary, 1987)
 Freddie Hubbard, Outpost (Enja, 1981)
 Robert Irving III, New Momentum (Sonic Portraits, 2007)
 Illinois Jacquet, The Blues; That's Me! (Prestige, 1969)
 Etta Jones, Ms. Jones to You (Muse, 1976)
 Hank Jones, Love for Sale (East Wind, 1976) as The Great Jazz Trio
 Willie Jones, III, Groundwork (Wj3, 2016)
 Rahsaan Roland Kirk, The Return of the 5000 Lb. Man (Warner Bros., 1975)
 Eric Kloss, Essence (Muse, 1973)
 Lee Konitz, Yes, Yes, Nonet (SteepleChase, 1979)
 Prince Lasha and Sonny Simmons, Firebirds (Contemporary, 1968)
 Jeff Lederer, Sunwatcher (Jazzheads, Inc., 2011)
 Charles Lloyd, Acoustic Masters I (Atlantic, 1994)
 Jon Lucien, Mother Nature's Son (Mercury, 1993)
 Marguerite Mariama, Wild Women Never Get the Blues... Well, Not Anymore! (From The Inside Out, 2006)
 Branford Marsalis, Renaissance (Columbia, 1986)
 Bennie Maupin, The Jewel in the Lotus (ECM, 1974)
 Ken McIntyre, Open Horizon (SteepleChase, 1976)
 Tom McIntosh, With Malice Toward None (IPO, 2004)
 René McLean, Watch Out (SteepleChase, 1975)
 Carlos McKinney, Up-Front (Sirocco, 1997)
 Carmen McRae, I'm Coming Home Again (Buddah, 1980)
 Charles McPherson, McPherson's Mood (Prestige, 1969)
 Helen Merrill and Gil Evans Collaboration (EmArcy, 1988)
 Ralph Moore, 623 C Street (Criss Cross, 1987)
 James Morrison and Adam Makowicz, Swiss Encounter (EastWest, 1989)
 Sam Morrison, Dune (Inner City, 1976)
 Alphonse Mouzon, The Essence of Mystery (Blue Note, 1972)
 Tiger Onitsuka, A Time in New York (Savoy, 2008)
 Nathen Page, Page-Ing Nathen (Hugo's Music, 1982)
 Cecil Payne, Bird Gets the Worm (Muse, 1976)
 Emily Remler, East To Wes (Concord,1988)
 Claudio Roditi, Free Wheelin': The Music of Lee Morgan (Reservoir, 1994)
 Roots, Saying Something (In+Out, 1995) 
 Ben Riley, Weaver of Dreams (Joken, 1996)
 Red Rodney, Red, White and Blues (Muse, 1978)
 Renee Rosnes, Without Words (Blue Note, 1993)
 Charlie Rouse, The Upper Manhattan Jazz Society with Benny Bailey (Enja, 1985) – rec. 1981
 Jim Schapperoew, This One's For Pearle (Kerralee, 1980)
 Jonathan Schwartz, Sings Arthur Schwartz (Muse, 1977)
 Jimmy Smith, Go for Watcha' Know (Blue Note, 1986)
 Dr. Lonnie Smith, The Turbanator (32 Jazz, 2000) – rec. 1991
 Charles Sullivan, Re-Entry (WhyNot, 1976)
 Carl Saunders, Out of the Blue (SNL, 1995)
 Sarah Vaughan, Sassy Swings the Tivoli (Mercury, 1963) as "Charles Williams"
 Roseanna Vitro, Listen Here (Texas Rose, 1984)
 Chip White, Harlem Sunset (Postcards, 1994)
 Lenny White, George Colligan and Steve Wilson, Hancock Island: The Music of Herbie Hancock (Chesky, 2008)
 Larry Willis, The Big Push (HighNote, 2006)
 James Williams, The Arioso Touch (Concord Jazz, 1982)
 The Mary Lou Williams Collective, Zodiac Suite: Revisited (Mary, 2006)
 Piotr Wojtasik, Quest'' (Power Bros, 1997)

References

External links

[ All Music]
Buster Williams website

1942 births
Living people
Camden High School (New Jersey) alumni
Musicians from Camden, New Jersey
Jazz fusion double-bassists
Post-bop double-bassists
Hard bop double-bassists
Mainstream jazz double-bassists
American jazz double-bassists
African-American jazz musicians
Male double-bassists
American jazz bandleaders
American Buddhists
Members of Sōka Gakkai
Chesky Records artists
Muse Records artists
SteepleChase Records artists
HighNote Records artists
Nichiren Buddhists
21st-century double-bassists
21st-century American male musicians
American male jazz musicians
Sphere (American band) members
The 360 Degree Music Experience members
The Jazztet members
Smoke Sessions Records artists